Methodist Girls' High School ( Metaṭisṭ Peṇkaḷ Uyartarap Pāṭacālai, also known as Methodist Girls' College) is a provincial school in Point Pedro, Sri Lanka. Founded in 1823 by British Methodist missionaries, it is one of Sri Lanka's oldest schools.

See also
 List of schools in Northern Province, Sri Lanka

References

External link
Methodist Girls’ High School

Educational institutions established in 1823
Former Methodist schools in Sri Lanka
Girls' schools in Sri Lanka
Provincial schools in Sri Lanka
Schools in Point Pedro
Wesleyan Methodist Mission of Ceylon (North) schools